Lenox is a town in Madison County, New York, United States.  The population was 9,112 as of the 2010 census.

The Town of Lenox is on the county's northern border. It is west of the City of Oneida.

History 

The first settlement began circa 1792. The town was formed in 1809 from the Town of Sullivan.

Some novels of Walter D. Edmonds characterize life in the area at the time of the Erie Canal construction.

Geography
The northern town line, defined by Oneida Lake, is the border of Oneida County. The Oneida Creek is on the eastern town boundary. The New York State Thruway (Interstate 90) crosses the town.

The village of New Lenox, Illinois is named in honor of Lenox.

Demographics

As of the census of 2000, there were 8,665 people, 3,485 households, and 2,359 families residing in the town.  The population density was 238.0 per square mile (91.9/km2).  There were 3,877 housing units at an average density of 106.5 per square mile (41.1/km2).  The racial makeup of the town was 97.66% White, 0.66% African American, 0.46% Native American, 0.24% Asian, 0.01% Pacific Islander, 0.24% from other races, and 0.73% from two or more races. Hispanic or Latino of any race were 0.87% of the population.

There were 3,485 households, out of which 31.2% had children under the age of 18 living with them, 52.4% were married couples living together, 10.2% had a female householder with no husband present, and 32.3% were non-families. 26.7% of all households were made up of individuals, and 13.1% had someone living alone who was 65 years of age or older.  The average household size was 2.48 and the average family size was 2.99.

In the town, the population was spread out, with 25.7% under the age of 18, 6.6% from 18 to 24, 29.4% from 25 to 44, 23.5% from 45 to 64, and 14.8% who were 65 years of age or older.  The median age was 38 years. For every 100 females, there were 93.8 males.  For every 100 females age 18 and over, there were 92.5 males.

The median income for a household in the town was $38,491, and the median income for a family was $46,458. Males had a median income of $34,602 versus $24,922 for females. The per capita income for the town was $17,398.  About 6.5% of families and 10.6% of the population were below the poverty line, including 13.4% of those under age 18 and 14.5% of those age 65 or over.

Communities and locations in Lenox 
Campbells Corner – A hamlet in the northwestern part of the town.
Canastota – An incorporated village in the southern part of the town.
Five Corners – A location east of Wampsville.
Lenox – The hamlet of Lenox, at the southern town line below Wampsville.
Lenox Basin – A location east of Canastota.
Messenger Bay – A hamlet near the western town line by the shore of Lake Oneida on Route 31.
Oneida Lake Beach East – A hamlet on the shore of Oneida Lake, east of Messenger Bay.
Oneida Valley – A location near the eastern town line.
Quality Hill – A hamlet southwest of Canastota, located on Route 5.
South Bay – A bay of Oneida Lake.
South Bay – A hamlet on the shore of Oneida Lake by South Bay, located on Route 31.
Union Corners – A location northeast of Canastota.
Walkers Corners – A hamlet southeast of Whitelaw.
Wampsville – The Village of Wampsville is the county seat.  It is located near the eastern town line on Route 5.
Whitelaw –  A hamlet south of Messenger Bay.

References

External links
  Early Lenox history
 Town of Lenox

Syracuse metropolitan area
Towns in Madison County, New York